Aren't We All? is a comic play by Frederick Lonsdale.

At the core of the drawing room comedy's slim plot is the Hon. William Tatham who, having been consigned to the proverbial doghouse for a romantic indiscretion, is determined to catch his self-righteous wife in an extramarital kiss of her own, while a society grande dame attempts to snare herself a peer prone to afternoon assignations with shopgirls at the British Museum.

The play premiered on Broadway on May 21, 1923, with a cast that included Leslie Howard, Robert Beatty, Cyril Maude, Alma Tell, Mabel Terry-Lewis, and Jack Whiting. Neither this production nor a revival two years later was successful.

Six decades later, a West End revival directed by Clifford Williams and presented by impresario Douglas Urbanski opened at the Haymarket Theatre in 1984 and transferred to Broadway. After nineteen previews, it opened on April 29, 1985, at the Brooks Atkinson Theatre, where it enjoyed a sold out limited run of only 93 performances; the all-star cast that included Rex Harrison, Claudette Colbert, Lynn Redgrave, John Michael King, and George Rose. Drama Desk Award nominations went to Redgrave as Outstanding Actress in a Play and the production as Outstanding Revival. Following the Broadway run (where Jeremy Brett replaced King, and Brenda Forbes joined the cast), the production toured successfully for nearly a year, playing in Los Angeles, Sydney, Melbourne, and a sold-out run at Washington's National Theatre.

Film adaptation

A film version was made in 1932. This starred Gertrude Lawrence and Owen Nares, and was produced by Walter Morosco and directed by Harry Lachman.

External links
The full text of Aren't We All? at HathiTrust Digital Library
 (1923 production)
 (1985 production)

1923 plays
Broadway plays
Plays by Frederick Lonsdale
West End plays
British plays adapted into films